The prime minister of the State of Qatar is the second most powerful official of Qatar, who heads the Government of Qatar.

Khalifa bin Hamad Al Thani, the Emir of Qatar from the coup d'état of 22 February 1972, was the first holder of this position from its establishment on 29 May 1970. He served as prime minister until the coup d'état of 27 June 1995, when he was deposed by his son Hamad bin Khalifa Al Thani.

On 28 January 2020, Khalid bin Khalifa bin Abdul Aziz Al Thani became the prime minister, as Abdullah bin Nasser bin Khalifa Al Thani resigned.

List of officeholders (1970–present)

See also 
 Politics of Qatar
 Emir of Qatar

References 

Political history of Qatar
Government of Qatar
 
Prime ministers
Qatar